Batrachedra saurota is a species of moth of the family Batrachedridae. It is known from South Africa.

References

Endemic moths of South Africa
Batrachedridae
Moths of Africa
Moths described in 1911